Batman: Strange Days is a 2014 animated superhero short film based on the popular DC Comics character Batman. Directed by Bruce Timm, it was created to celebrate the 75th anniversary of the conception of the character.

Plot
A young blonde woman is abducted by Dr. Hugo Strange, who intends to use her for an experiment. He has one of his Monster Men bring her to his secret laboratory on a relatively isolated mountain, but they are ambushed by the Dark Knight, who attacks them in order to free the woman. After defeating the Monster Man, Batman turns his attention 
to Strange, who is holding the woman hostage on the edge of a cliff, and threatens to kill her if Batman comes closer. Batman's sudden move causes him to lose his balance and fall into the abyss. Batman saves the woman from falling as well and the two of them watch as Strange falls to his apparent death.

Production
Bruce Timm stated that Strange Days is the Batman story that he would create if he was "boss of the world." The short was created in black and white and takes place in 1939, the year Batman debuted in the comics.

Cast
 Batman - Kevin Conroy
 Hugo Strange - Brian George
 Woman - Tara Strong
 Monster Man - Bruce Timm

See also
 Chase Me

References

External links

Batman: Strange Days at the DC Comics Database

2014 films
2014 animated films
2014 short films
2010s animated superhero films
2010s Warner Bros. animated short films
Animated Batman films
Animated short films based on DC Comics
Warner Bros. Animation animated short films
2010s English-language films
2010s American films